Politsi is a village in the municipality of  Greater Tzaneen, Mopani District, Limpopo, South Africa.

References

Populated places in the Greater Tzaneen Local Municipality